Mohammed Babagana Monguno  (born 1957) is a Nigerian retired military general and current National Security Adviser. He was the Chief of Defence Intelligence from July 2009 to September 2011; and the Commander of the Brigade of Guards from 2007 to 2009.

Early life and education
Babagana Mohammed Monguno is from Borno State,

Monguno was educated at King's College, Lagos. He then proceeded to the Nigerian Defence Academy where he was an officer cadet in the 21st Regular Course with other officers such as Alex Sabundu Badeh and Emeka Onwuamaegbu.

Military career
Monguno previously served as the Chief of Logistics at Defence Headquarters and later as Commander of the Nigerian Army Training and Doctrine Command (TRADOC).

Monguno also served as Commander, Guards Brigade, Deputy Commandant, National Defence College, and Chief of Defence Intelligence. Prior to his retirement from the Nigerian army he was considered for Chief of Army Staff position.

Monguno voluntarily retired from the Nigerian Army in September 2013 after turning 56, the age ceiling for Major General in the Nigerian army.

National Security Adviser
Monguno was appointed National Security Adviser on July 13, 2015 by President Muhammadu Buhari.

Awards
In October 2022, a Nigerian national honour of Commander of the Order of the Federal Republic (CFR) was conferred on him by President Muhammadu Buhari.

References

Living people
Nigerian generals
Nigerian Army officers
King's College, Lagos alumni
People from Borno State
Chiefs of Nigeria Defence Intelligence Agency
Nigerian Defence Academy alumni
Nigerian Army Brigade of Guards Commanders
1957 births